The Anthipes flycatchers are a genus of Old World flycatchers.

The genus contains the following species:

 White-gorgeted flycatcher, Anthipes monileger
 Rufous-browed flycatcher, Anthipes solitaris

References

Sangster, G., P. Alström, E. Forsmark, and U. Olsson. 2010. Multi-locus phylogenetic analysis of Old World chats and flycatchers reveals extensive paraphyly at family, subfamily and genus level (Aves: Muscicapidae). Molecular Phylogenetics and Evolution 57: 380–392.
Outlaw, D.C., Voelker, G. 2006. Systematics of Ficedula flycatchers (Muscicapidae): A molecular reassessment of a taxonomic enigma. Molecular Phylogenetics and Evolution Vol. 41:1, pp 118–126.  PDF fulltext

 
Bird genera
Taxa named by Edward Blyth